Best in the World '16 was a professional wrestling pay-per-view (PPV) event produced by Ring of Honor (ROH). It took place in Cabarrus Arena in Concord, North Carolina on June 24, 2016. It was the seventh annual ROH Best in the World event. The event saw the appearance of WCW legend Kevin Sullivan.

Eight matches took place at the event. In the main event, Jay Lethal defeated Jay Briscoe to retain the ROH World Championship in their rematch since last year's event. Other prominent matches were B. J. Whitmer defeating Steve Corino in a non-sanctioned fight without honor (originally scheduled for Final Battle 2015, but because Corino's neck surgery and Whitmer's knee injury, it took place at Best in the World '16) after the interference of Kevin Sullivan, The Addiction (Christopher Daniels & Frankie Kazarian) retaining the ROH World Tag Team Championships against The Motor City Machine Guns (Alex Shelley & Chris Sabin), the Bullet Club (The Young Bucks (Matt & Nick Jackson) & Adam Cole) defeating War Machine (Hanson & Raymond Rowe) & Moose and Mark Briscoe defeating Roderick Strong. The event marked the last PPV matches of both Steve Corino and Roderick Strong. Corino left on December 31, 2016 and Strong left on June 25, 2016, and both joined WWE.

Storylines 
Best in the World '16 featured professional wrestling matches that involved wrestlers from pre-existing scripted feuds, plots, and storylines that played out on ROH's primary television program, Ring of Honor Wrestling. Wrestlers portrayed heroes or villains as they followed a series of events that built tension and culminated in a wrestling match or series of matches.

Results

See also
 2016 in professional wrestling

References

Professional wrestling in North Carolina
2016 in North Carolina
Events in North Carolina
Events in Concord, North Carolina
2016
June 2016 events in the United States
2016 Ring of Honor pay-per-view events